Garhwal (IPA: /ɡəɽʋːɔɭ/) is one of the two administrative divisions of the Indian state of Uttarakhand. Lying in the Himalayas, it is bounded on the north by Tibet, on the east by Kumaon, on the south by Uttar Pradesh state, and on the northwest by Himachal Pradesh state. It includes the districts of Chamoli, Dehradun, Haridwar, Pauri Garhwal, Rudraprayag, Tehri Garhwal, and Uttarkashi. The people of Garhwal are known as Garhwali and speak the Garhwali language. The administrative center for Garhwal division is the town of Pauri. The Divisional Commissioner is the administrative head of the Division, and is a senior Indian Administrative Service officer. As the administrative head of the division, the Commissioner is overall incharge of the 7 districts in the Garhwal region of Uttarakhand, and is aided in his duties by an additional commissioner and the district magistrates. Sushil Kumar is the divisional commissioner of the Garhwal Division since December 2021.

History

The Garhwal Himalayas appear to have been a favorite locale for the voluminous mythology of the Puranic period. The traditional name of Garhwal was kedarkhand means "the land of God". Excavations have revealed that it formed part of the Mauryan Empire.

The earliest reference regarding Garhwal and its pride spots are cited in the Skanda Purana and the Mahabharata in the Van Parva. Skanda Purana defines the boundaries and extend of this holy land. It also finds mention in the 7th-century travelogue of Huen Tsang. However, it is with Adi Shankaracharya that the name of Garhwal will always be linked, for the great 8th-century spiritual reformer visited the remote, snow-laden heights of Garhwal, established a Joshimath and restored some of the most sacred shrines, including Badrinath and Kedarnath.

The history of Garhwal as a unified whole began in the 15th century, when king Ajai Pal merged the 52 separate principalities, each with its own garh or fortress. For 300 years, Garhwal remained one kingdom, with its capital at Srinagar (on the left bank of Alaknanda river). Then Pauri and Dehradun were perforce ceded to the Crown as payment for British help, rendered to the Garhwalis during the Gurkha invasion, in the early 19th century.

The earliest ruling dynasty of Garhwal known is of the Katyuris. The Katyuri Raja of Uttarakhand (Kumaon and Garhwal) was styled 'Sri Basdeo Giriraj Chakara Churamani'. The earliest traditions record that the possessions of Joshimath Katyuris in Garhwal extended from Satluj as far as Gandaki and from the snows to plains, including the whole of Rohilkhand. Tradition gives the origin of their Raj at Joshimath in the north near Badrinath and subsequent migration to Katyur Valley in Almora district, where a city called Kartikeyapura was founded.

Katyuris ruled Uttarakhand up to the 11th century and in certain pockets even after their decline. In Garhwal their disruption brought into existence 52 independent chiefs. One of the important principalities in that period was that of Parmars, who held their sway over Chandpur Garhi or Fortress. Katyuris ruled Uttarakhand up to the 11th century and in certain pockets even after their decline. Kanak Pal was progenitor of this dynasty. Raja Ajay Pal, a scion of the Parmars in the 14th century is credited with having brought these chiefs under his rule. After his conquest Ajay Pal's domain was recognised as Garhwal owing to exuberance of forts. It is possible that after annexing all principalities, Raja Ajay Pal must have become famous as Garhwala, the owner of forts. With the passage of time his kingdom came to be known as Garhwal.

Garhwal Kingdom

Garhwal Kingdom was founded by Parmars. Nearly 700 years ago, one of these chiefs, Ajai Pal, reduced all the minor principalities under him and founded the Garhwal Kingdom. He and his ancestors ruled over Garhwal and the adjacent state of Tehri-Garhwal, in an uninterrupted line till 1803, when the Gurkhas invaded Kumaon and Garhwal, driving the Garhwal chief into the plains. For 12 years the Gurkhas ruled the country with an iron rod, until a series of encroachments by them on British territory led to the Gurkha War in 1814. At the termination of the campaign, Garhwal and Kumaon were converted into British districts, while the Tehri principality was restored to a son of the former chief.

After annexation, Garhwal rapidly advanced in material prosperity. IN 1901 the population was 429,900. Two battalions of the Indian army (the 39th Garhwal Rifles) were recruited in the district, which contained the military cantonment of Lansdowne. Grain and coarse cloth were exported, and salt, borax, livestock and wool were imported. Trade with Tibet was considerable. The administrative headquarters was at the village of Pauri, but Srinagar was the largest city. It was an important mart, as was Kotdwara, the terminus of a branch of the Oudh and Rohilkhand railway from Najibabad.

During the turn of the 19th century, the Gurkhas attacked Garhwal and drove the rulers of Garhwal down to the plains (Rishikesh, Haridwar, DehraDun). Pradyumna Shah died fighting at the battle of Khurbura. Thereafter the rulers of Garhwal took the help of the British forces in India and regained their kingdom. The rulers of Garhwal gave away 60% of their kingdom for the support the British gave them in driving back the Gurhkas.

During the Second World War, the Raja Narendra Shah contributed his troops and aircraft to the British war effort. In recognition for his services, the British gave him the title of "Maharaja", made him a Knight Commander of the Order of the Star of India (KCSI) and knighted him. Thus his full title was Sir Maharaja Narendra Shah KCSI.

Geography

The region consists almost entirely of rugged mountain ranges running in all directions and separated by narrow valleys, which in some cases become deep gorges or ravines. The only level portion of the district was a narrow strip of waterless forest between the southern slopes of the hills and the fertile plains of Rohilkhand. The highest mountains are in the eastern Chamoli district, the principal peaks being Nanda Devi , Kamet , Chaukhamba , Trisul , Dunagiri , and Kedarnath .

The Alaknanda River, one of the main sources of the Ganges, receives with its affluents the whole drainage of the district. At Devprayag the Alaknanda joins the Bhagirathi, and thenceforward the united streams bear the name of the Ganges. Cultivation is principally confined to the immediate vicinity of the rivers, which are employed for irrigation.

In June 2013 a multi-day cloudburst centered in the mountainous valleys of the area resulted in widespread damage and over 5,000 deaths. It was India's worst natural disaster insofar as death toll since the 2004 tsunami.

Demographics

People
The majority of the inhabitants are Garhwalis. The culture of the present Garhwal is an amalgamation of influences from the indigenous population coupled with traditions superimposed by immigrants who settled in the region. A majority of the people are involved in the agriculture, tourism and the defense industry.

Languages
Garhwali, spoken by about  million people as of to the 2011 census, is the majority language in all but the two southern districts of Haridwar and Dehradun, where the language with the largest proportion of speakers according to the census was Hindi. Native to  million people, Hindi has official status and is widely used in administration and education. Other languages with large numbers of speakers are Urdu (mostly in Haridwar and Dehradun), Jaunsari ( people mostly in the Jaunsar–Bawar region of Dehradun), Nepali ( speakers, with the largest concentration in Dehradun), and Punjabi (mostly in Dehradun). The set of indigenous languages also includes Mahasu Pahari (found in the north-western district of Uttarkashi in the north-west), and the Sino-Tibetan languages Jad (also in Uttarkashi) and Rongpo (of Chamoli district).

References

External links

 
Divisions of Uttarakhand